Lucas Daniel Abraham López (born February 23, 1979) is a retired Argentine retired football forward.

Abraham started his career in the lower divisions of Argentine football with All Boys. He has gone on to play for a number of clubs across Latin America, spending much of his career to date playing in Venezuela.

Abraham had a brief return to Argentine football in 2005 when he played for Gimnasia y Tiro de Salta and then he came back to this team in 2010.

External links
 BDFA profile
 Copa Sudamericana profile for Carabobo FC

1979 births
Living people
Footballers from Buenos Aires
Argentine expatriate footballers
Argentine footballers
C.D. FAS footballers
All Boys footballers
Club Alianza Lima footballers
San Salvador F.C. footballers
C.D. Juventud Independiente players
Gimnasia y Tiro footballers
Cúcuta Deportivo footballers
UA Maracaibo players
Argentine expatriate sportspeople in Colombia
Argentine expatriate sportspeople in Peru
Argentine expatriate sportspeople in Venezuela
Argentine expatriate sportspeople in El Salvador
Expatriate footballers in Colombia
Expatriate footballers in Peru
Expatriate footballers in Venezuela
Expatriate footballers in El Salvador
Association football forwards